Ophrys lunulata, the moon orchid, is a species of orchid native to the islands of Malta and Sicily in the central Mediterranean.

In 1992 Ophrys lunulata was designated as a 'priority species' under Annex II of the Habitats Directive of the European Community (which was reformed as the European Union the following year). This designation was meant to serve as the basis for Italy to declare which areas in which it occurs are 'Special Areas of Conservation' -which were to form the backbone of the Natura 2000 network, but only if these areas include one of the number of habitats listed in Annex I of the directive.

References

External links

AMINT Assosiazione Micologica e Botanica, Ophrys lunulata Parl.
Progetto Life-Natura, Scheda ''Ophrys lunulata'
European Orchids, Wordpress, Johan Dierckx, Belgische en Europese Orchideeen, Ophrys lunulata

lunulata
Orchids of Europe
Flora of Sicily
Plants described in 1838